Unveiled in 1922, the Pitlochry War Memorial is located in the Scottish town of Pitlochry Perth and Kinross. A Category C listed structure, it stands just in front of the town's Memorial Garden (formerly known as the Pitlochry Institute Park). It initially commemorated 81 men and one woman (a nurse) of Moulin parish who died in World War I. The sixteen who died in World War II action were later added.

The site and memorial were gifts of Colonel and Mrs C. A. J. Butter of Cluniemore.

Memorial Garden

References 

1922 establishments in Scotland
War memorial
Category C listed buildings in Perth and Kinross
Cenotaphs in the United Kingdom
British military memorials and cemeteries
1922 sculptures
Stone sculptures in the United Kingdom
Outdoor sculptures in Scotland
Monuments and memorials in Scotland
World War I memorials in Scotland
World War II memorials in Scotland